Jullutahuarco (possibly from Quechua qulluta, kalluta mortar, warkhu hanging; a coin,) is a mountain in the west of the Huayhuash mountain range in the Andes of Peru, about  high. It is located in the Lima Region, Cajatambo Province, Copa District. Jullutahuarco lies on the sub-range west of Yerupaja, south of Rajucollota, Huacrish and Auxilio. It is situated north of the Huayllapa River.

References

Mountains of Peru
Mountains of Lima Region